Grey South was a federal electoral district represented in the House of Commons of Canada from 1876 to 1917. It was located in the province of Ontario. It was created by the British North America Act of 1867 which divided the County of Grey into two ridings: Grey South and Grey North.

The South Riding consisted of the Townships of Bentinck, Glenelg, Artemesia, Osprey, Normanby, Egremont, Proton and Melancthon. In 1872, the County of Grey was divided into three ridings when Grey East was created. The townships of Artemesia, Osprey, Proton and Melancthon were excluded from the south riding. In 1882, the township of Artemesia and the town of Durham were incorporated into the riding. In 1903, the township of Sullivan and the village of Hanover were incorporated into the riding.

The electoral district was abolished in 1914 when it was merged into Grey Southeast riding.

Election results

|}

|}

|}

|}

|}

|}

|}

|}

|}

|}

|}

See also 

 List of Canadian federal electoral districts
 Past Canadian electoral districts

References

External links 
Riding history from the Library of Parliament

Former federal electoral districts of Ontario